The white-winged black tit (Melaniparus leucomelas) is a passerine bird in the tit family Paridae. It is also known as the white-winged tit, dark-eyed black tit or northern black tit. The species was first described by Eduard Rüppell in 1840.

Description
It is mainly black with a white wing patch, but differs from the more northern white-shouldered tit (Melaniparus guineensis) with which it sometimes considered conspecific in that it has a dark eye.

Range and races
It is found in central Africa, from Angola in the west to Ethiopia in the east. There are two races:
 M. l. subsp. leucomelas Rüppell, 1840 – Ethiopia, Eritrea, Sudan and South Sudan
 M. l. subsp. insignis Cabanis, 1880 – African equator to southern subtropics

Taxonomy
The white-winged black tit was formerly one of the many species in the genus Parus but was moved to Melaniparus after a molecular phylogenetic analysis published in 2013 showed that the members of the new genus formed a distinct clade.

References

External links
 
 
 Sound recordings, xeno-canto

white-winged black tit
Birds of Sub-Saharan Africa
white-winged black tit